South Fulton may refer to:

South Fulton, Georgia
South Fulton, Tennessee